Terra Cotta Building is a historic office building and display center located at Alfred in Allegany County, New York. It was built in 1892 by the Celadon Terra Cotta Co and later sold in 1906, to the Ludowici Company of Ohio, which became the Ludowici-Celadon Company. It is a one-story,  building built almost entirely of terra cotta bricks, ornamental and roofing tiles manufactured by Celadon. The building was designed as a sales office for the company, and was considered a "catalog" of their work. A replica was erected at the 1893 Columbian Exposition in Chicago. The building was the only remaining structure after a fire broke out on August 29, 1909 and destroyed what was at the time called Ludowici-Celadon Company.

In 1969, when Alfred University planned to construct a new gymnasium on the site, the Alfred Historical Society worked to preserve and move the building. It was relocated to its present site, across the street from the Alfred Post Office, in 1974. The Alfred Historical Society hosts open houses throughout the year for people wishing to examine the interior and learn about the history of the building and the tile company.

It was listed on the National Register of Historic Places in 1972.

Gallery

References

External links
The Celadon Terra Cotta Co- Herrick Memorial Library, Alfred University

Office buildings on the National Register of Historic Places in New York (state)
Office buildings completed in 1892
Buildings and structures in Allegany County, New York
Museums in Allegany County, New York
National Register of Historic Places in Allegany County, New York